Pseudopalaina is a genus of small land snails with an operculum, terrestrial gastropod mollusks  in the family Diplommatinidae.

Species
Species within the genus Pseudopalaina include:
 Pseudopalaina polymorpha

References
 Nomenclator Zoologicus info

 
Diplommatinidae
Taxonomy articles created by Polbot